Pags or variant may refer to:

Places
 Gustavus Airport (ICAO airport code: PAGS) in Alaska

People
 Pagliarulo nickname form
 Joe Pags (born 1966) U.S. radio talk show host

See also
 pag (disambiguation), for the singular of "Pags"
 PAG (disambiguation),.for the singular of "PAGs"